Private education in Dubai is regulated by the Knowledge and Human Development Authority. The UAE Ministry of Education is responsible for public schools in Dubai. Currently, more than 90% of school education in Dubai takes place in the private sector, served by 194 private schools offering 17 different curricula to more than 280,000 students from 182 nationalities. Dubai has 26 international branch campuses of universities from 12 different countries - including the UK, Australia and India. More than 30,000 students attend these universities, with the majority studying business, engineering and media & design. The Knowledge and Human Development Authority (KHDA) was founded in 2006 to develop education and human resource sectors in Dubai, and license educational institutes.

Public schooling 

Public schools are all gender segregated. Primary and secondary education is free of cost for all Emiratis and compulsory for boys and girls at the all grades. The medium of instruction in public schools for all subjects is Arabic, and English is used as a second language.

Private schooling 
As of 2017, there are 194 private schools in Dubai that offer one of the following curricula (arranged by number of schools following curriculum): British, Indian, American, the UAE Ministry of Education Curriculum, International Baccalaureate, Iranian, French, Filipino, Pakistani, SABIS, IAT, German, Russian, Japanese, and Canadian. In total, 273,599 students from 187 different nationalities were enrolled in private schools in the 2016/17 academic year. This is heavily weighted towards younger year groups with 42% in primary education, 25% in secondary, 15% in tertiary, and 18% in kindergarten. The British and Indian curricula alone account for 64% of all enrollment in Dubai-based private schools.

Tuition at these private schools range from AED 1,725 to AED 107,200 per year, and Dubai's annual revenue from private schooling fees is AED 5.35bn. 39% of students pay less than AED 10,000 in tuition per year.

There is some correlation between fees and the rating of the school, and this has strengthened with the KHDA ruling on school fees that allows top rated Outstanding schools to put up fees at a higher percentage than those rated more poorly.

Private schools in the UAE teach in English, but they must offer core programs such as Arabic as a second language for non-Arabic-speakers.

All students take Arabic classes, either as a primary or secondary language. Muslim and Arab students must also take Islamic studies.

Primary education 
Primary education is compulsory from the age of 5 by the Ministry of Education in the UAE.  Most schools offers both primary and secondary instruction so students do not need to transfer to a separate school location upon graduating from primary school.

American curriculum runs from Kindergarten (5 years old) to Grade 8 (14 years old). British curriculum runs from Year 1 (4–5 years old) to Year 9 (14 years old). International Baccalaureate Primary Years Programme is for ages 3–12.

Secondary education 
Secondary school is from grades 6 to 9. Most of the secondary schools require students to take standardized tests such as Advanced Placement, SAT, IB Diploma, IGCSE, GCE Advanced level or CBSE.
Other options include vocational education PEARSON BTEC level 2 Diplomas and Level 3 Extended Diplomas. A new curriculum being offered is the IB Career-related Programme which can include a BTEC and is offered at 6 schools in UAE.

Training centers in Dubai 

Nothing less than half of all training centers and specialized postgraduate education institutes in the UAE is located in Dubai, the largest and most populous city of the country. They provide training options for students of all ages on various programs. Training centers that offer courses in commerce and management (e.g. Atton Institute ) aviation and air transport (e.g. Aviation Training Center ), medicine (e.g. Prime Medical Training Center  ) are much sought after, health and safety training centers (e.g. Arbrit Safety Training and Consultancy ), as well as Arabic language courses for expatriates ), and English courses preparing their participants for IELTS or TOEFL (e.g. Express English language training center ).

In the main, learning at such centers is arranged in the form of short (3–5 days) intensive courses and training. Some training centers offer in-house training for corporate clients. Dubai also often hosts thematic seminars, conferences and even Expo 2020 is to take place here.

The work of professional training centers in Dubai is regulated by the local authority, Knowledge and Human Development Authority (KHDA). Each company that intends to perform vocational training in the territory of the Emirate of Dubai must obtain a license from KHDA. 

Many of the training centers are located in the specialized free economic zones of the Dubai Academic City and Dubai Knowledge Village.

Tertiary education 
A sizable number of foreign accredited universities have been set up in Dubai.  Most of their campuses are located at Dubai International Academic City, a purpose built free zone for tertiary academic institutions. The Harvard Medical School Dubai Center (HMSDC) Institute for Postgraduate Education and Research has been established as well in Dubai Health Care City. The RIT Dubai campus is located in Dubai Silicon Oasis.

In 2010, Michigan State University Dubai closed all undergraduate programs.

Public libraries 

Dubai Public Libraries is the public library system in Dubai.

See also 

 List of schools in the United Arab Emirates
 List of universities in the United Arab Emirates
 Education in the United Arab Emirates
 University of Wollongong in Dubai

References

External links
ADEC Abu Dhabi - ADEC Abu Dhabi official website education information
Knowledge and Human Development Authority (KHDA) - Official website
Education in Dubai guide - general guide to UAE school education and curriculums.